The  (Munich Art Fair) is the oldest art and antiques fair in Germany. Held annually in the autumn with a run-time of ten days, it is a fair for the general public, attended by leading national and international exhibitors. For some time now its venue is the historic  in Munich, on Wredestraße near the Hackerbrücke. The offer ranges from Protohistory and Ancient History (such as Egypt) via the arts and crafts of the Middle Ages and the Renaissance through to art and design of Modernism until approximately 1970, with occasional exceptions.

History 
After a re-organization (and a transitory name change to Fine Art & Antiques for legal reasons), the historic  in Munich was determined as the venue.

Offer 
The offer comprises all periods and basically all genres of arts and crafts are on show, although the focus may vary. Objects from art and curiosity cabinets and textile art (rugs and carpets) are included, so are vintage cars.

Catalogues 
 , Munich 1956
 All subsequent catalogues in WorldCat

See also 
 Highlights – Internationale Kunstmesse München

External links 
 Homepage of Kunstmesse München
 Homepage of Kunsthändlerverband Deutschland

References

Recurring events established in 1956
Trade fairs in Germany
Tourist attractions in Munich
Art fairs
1956 establishments in West Germany